Minor Adjustments is an American television sitcom that aired on NBC from September 16, 1995 until November 26, 1995, and on UPN from January 23, 1996 until June 4, 1996. The series starred stand-up comedian Rondell Sheridan in his first headlined TV series, as a child psychologist and family man who has a remarkable ability to connect with his young patients. Sheridan co-created the series with Ken Estin and Dwayne Johnson-Cochran, and it was produced by Witt/Thomas Productions in association with Warner Bros. Television.

Synopsis
Successful therapist Dr. Ron Aimes (Rondell Sheridan) is a child psychologist who, being a child at heart, has a special gift for talking with children. His wife, Rachel (Wendy Raquel Robinson) is the voice of reason and "straight man" to her husband when it comes to keeping the Aimes family together as she also keep close eye on her precocious four-year-old daughter Emma (Camille Winbush) and clever ten-year-old Trevor (Bobby E. McAdams II). Keeping life interesting at the office for Dr. Aimes are medical partners Dr. Bruce Hampton (Mitchell Whitfield, seemingly more concerned with his dating life than his dental patients, the edgy and angry Dr. Francis Bailey (Linda Kash), a pediatrician who is recently divorced and fully enjoying her bitter outlook on life, and challenging everyone's patience as the spacey medical group receptionist is Darby Gladstone (Sara Rue), Dr. Hampton's niece.

Cast
Rondell Sheridan as Dr. Ron Aimes
Wendy Raquel Robinson as Rachel Aimes
Bobby E. McAdams II as Trevor Aimes
Camille Winbush as Emma Aimes
Mitchell Whitfield as Dr. Bruce Hampton
Linda Kash as Dr. Francine Bailey
Sara Rue as Darby Gladstone

Episodes

References

External links

NBC original programming
1995 American television series debuts
1996 American television series endings
1990s American black sitcoms
1990s American sitcoms
English-language television shows
Television series by Warner Bros. Television Studios
Television shows set in Philadelphia